Vittorio Claudio Surdo is an Italian diplomat (born 22 November 1943) was Ambassador of Italy to Russia, pictured here presenting his credentials to Russian President Vladimir Putin on 25 July 2006.

Honors
 Order of Merit of the Italian Republic 1st Class / Knight Grand Cross – September 11, 2010

References

Living people
Ambassadors of Italy to Russia
Italian diplomats
20th-century diplomats
Knights Grand Cross of the Order of Merit of the Italian Republic
1943 births